The Invisible Man may refer to the following TV series:

The Invisible Man (1958 TV series), a 1958 UK series
The Invisible Man (1975 TV series), a 1975 NBC series starring David McCallum
The Invisible Man (1984 TV series), a 1984 UK serial produced by the BBC
The Invisible Man (2000 TV series), a 2000 series on the Sci Fi Channel
The Invisible Man (2005 TV series), a 2005 animated TV series from Moonscoop

See also
 Gemini Man (TV series), a 1976 NBC series starring Ben Murphy, a restructuring of its 1975 David McCallum series
 The Vanishing Man